"Daddy Cool" is a song recorded by Boney M. and included on their debut album Take the Heat off Me. It was a 1976 hit and a staple of disco music and became Boney M.'s first hit in the United Kingdom. The song was produced and co-written by the group's founder Frank Farian, who also provided the male voice parts on the record.

The second Boney M. single, it was released in 1976 and made no major impact at first. After a presentation on the Musikladen TV show in September that year, the single became a hit, topping several European charts. It reached number six in the UK charts and number 65 in the United States Billboard Hot 100. The single also topped the German charts and reached the Top 20 in Canada. It proved to be the band's major European breakthrough.

Background
"Daddy Cool" was a novelty gimmick record with an unusual, percussive intro by producer Frank Farian doing rhythmic tic-tic-tics and playing on his teeth with a pencil. Farian also sang all male voice parts (Bobby Farrell always danced to full playback). His characteristic deep voice sings: "She's crazy like a fool..." and is answered by the multilayered voices of Liz Mitchell and Marcia Barrett: "...wild about Daddy Cool". This line has been misheard by listeners as "...what about Daddy Cool", so much so that the band started singing it that way during live performances. The bass riff kicks in and builds to the instrumental theme followed by the repetitive, nursery rhyme-like verse and chorus twice.

The song breaks down into a spoken passage by Farian before it goes back into the bass riff and repeats the verse and chorus for the last time. With its slightly hypnotic, repetitive bassline and strings and likewise repetitive, bright female vocals, the track is highly typical of mid-1970s "Munich disco".

Originally, Hansa Records wanted Boney M.'s cover of Bob Marley's "No Woman, No Cry" as the A-side of the single but Farian - seeing that his own song was the clear winner when testing both tracks in his discothèque in St. Ingbert – managed to persuade the record company to have it his way. In the US, Hungary and Japan (where the single wasn't released until November), the single was backed by the album track "Lovin' or Leavin'". In East Germany the record was released in 1977, backed by their next hit "Sunny".

Charts

Weekly charts

Year-end charts

Certifications and sales

1986 anniversary recording

Boney M.'s 10th anniversary was celebrated with a TV special and the album The Best of 10 Years – 32 Superhits. The original plans of releasing another single ("Dreadlock Holiday") from the group's final album Eye Dance were cancelled, instead producer Frank Farian recorded a new version of "Daddy Cool" in a special "anniversary recording", featuring rap parts, and new instrumental parts. The single, however, proved to be Boney M.'s worst-selling single, failing to chart anywhere. The B-side "B.M.A.G.O." appeared in a longer version on the 7" than on the 12" single. The 12" single also included an edit version of "Daddy Cool" which was not credited on the cover. The 7" version made its CD debut on The Collection (disc 2, track 1).

Releases
7" Single 
""Daddy Cool (Anniversary Recording '86)" – (Farian, Reyam, Farian, Bischof) 5:18 / "B.M.A.G.O." (Farian) – 4:10 (Hansa Records 107 994-100, 1986)

12" Single
"Daddy Cool (Anniversary Recording '86)" Special Club Mix – 9:07 / Extended Radio Edit (Not credited on label) – 5:50 / "B.M.A.G.O." – 3:15 (Hansa 607 994-213, 1986)

Boney M. 2000 version

Following the successful Sash! and Horny United remixes of "Ma Baker", Frank Farian remixed "Daddy Cool" as a follow-up single. An all-new line-up Boney M. 2000 featuring three young girls and rapper Mobi T. was featured in the video and also announced to front a forthcoming remix album. This decision was not popular with the group's fan base, and Farian subsequently dropped the idea. "Daddy Cool" could not match the success of its predecessor, peaking only at no. 47 in the German charts.

Releases
CD Single
"Daddy Cool '99 (Radio Edit)" – 3:51
"Daddy Cool '99 (Extended Vocal Club Mix)" – 5:06
"Daddy Cool '99 (Latino Club Mix)" – 3:33
"Daddy Cool '99 (Solid Gold Edit)" – 3:45
"Daddy Cool (Original Mix 1976)" – 3:26

12" Single
"Daddy Cool '99 (Extended Vocal Club Mix)" – 5:06
"Daddy Cool '99 (Disco Dub Edit)" – 4:26
"Daddy Cool '99 (Latino Club Mix)" – 3:33
"Daddy Cool '99 (Solid Gold Edit)" – 3:45

Charts

2001 Remix

United Kingdom 2001 remix to support the album The Greatest Hits. Remixed by Jewels & Stone, the single peaked at no. 47 in the United Kingdom charts.

Releases
CD Single
"Daddy Cool" (Jewels & Stone Radio Edit) – 3:58
"Daddy Cool" (Original Mix) – 3:25
"Daddy Cool" (Jewels & Stone Club Mix) – 5:18

Lizot remix

German DJ duo Lizot released a remix of "Daddy Cool" on 3 December 2021.

Releases
Digital single
"Daddy Cool" – 2:34

Club VIP mix
"Daddy Cool" (Club VIP mix) – 2:50
"Daddy Cool" (Extended Club VIP mix) – 3:50
"Daddy Cool" – 2:34
"Daddy Cool" (Extended mix) – 3:36

Charts

Weekly charts

Year-end charts

Cover versions
Placebo included a cover version in their 2003 album Covers. The song was covered by Latvian trio Melo-M featuring vocals by original Boney M. singer Maizie Williams on their 2007 album Singalongs. "Daddy Cool" was used in an advert for Vauxhall, promoting their Zafira GSi. The song was sampled by Korean hip hop band DJ Doc for their 2000 single "Run to You".

See also
Lists of number-one singles (Austria)
List of European number-one hits of 1976
List of number-one singles of 1976 (France)
List of number-one hits of 1976 (Germany)
List of number-one songs in Norway
List of number-one singles of 1977 (Spain)
List of number-one singles and albums in Sweden
List of number-one singles from 1968 to 1979 (Switzerland)

References

1976 songs
1976 singles
Boney M. songs
Songs written by Frank Farian
Song recordings produced by Frank Farian
Atco Records singles
Atlantic Records singles
Hansa Records singles
European Hot 100 Singles number-one singles
Number-one singles in France
Number-one singles in Germany
Number-one singles in Norway
Number-one singles in Spain
Number-one singles in Sweden
Number-one singles in Switzerland
Ultratop 50 Singles (Flanders) number-one singles